Negha is a genus of square-headed snakeflies in the family Inocelliidae. There are at least three described species in Negha.

Species
These three species belong to the genus Negha:
 Negha inflata (Hagen, 1861) i c g
 Negha longicornis (Albarda, 1891) i c g
 Negha meridionalis U. Aspöck, 1988 i c g b
Data sources: i = ITIS, c = Catalogue of Life, g = GBIF, b = Bugguide.net

References

Further reading

 
 
 

Raphidioptera
Articles created by Qbugbot